Third Star is a 2010 British drama film directed by Hattie Dalton and starring Benedict Cumberbatch, JJ Feild, Tom Burke, Adam Robertson, and Hugh Bonneville. It premiered at the Edinburgh Film Festival in June 2010, where it was shown as the closing film, and was released in the United Kingdom on 20 May 2011.

Plot
After celebrating his 29th and - as everyone including himself knows - last birthday, James, a young man terminally ill with cancer, sets out on a last hiking trip with his three best friends, Davy, Bill and Miles. Their destination is James's favourite beach at Barafundle Bay, on the Pembrokeshire coast.

Davy is a kind, loyal and responsible soul who has been unemployed and helping James's family take care of him for quite a while already. Bill is boisterous and fun-loving, and everybody hopes he is finally getting around to breaking up with his oppressive girlfriend. Miles, lately absent from James's life, is a handsome intellectual turned into a businessman and the son of a successful novelist who died, also of cancer, when Miles was a child. James's and Miles's friendship used to be very close and has always bordered on rivalry, particularly as aspiring writers. James is too weak to walk much any more, so he mostly sits in a special cart and needs a lot of very practical and physical help from his companions, in addition to liquid morphine and other medications at increasing frequency to manage his chronic pain and other symptoms. Having been ill for years already, he seems to be at peace with his rapidly approaching death and takes childlike delight in everything this last journey has to offer. However, his failing strength and increasing discomfort and outright pain also bring out his bitterness in the knowledge that his life will be over before he ever had time to make anything much of it.

Traveling over the rugged and isolated coastal terrain, the young men fool around having light-hearted, juvenile fun to give James the time of his life. They also encounter various odd persons and situations and are faced with a series of setbacks and accidents, including loss of various supplies and finally the cart. Everyone's nerves and patience are sorely tested by James's outbursts at each of his friends in turn: out partly of premeditation and partly of spontaneous pain-induced anger, he seems to attempt to shake them out of mediocrity, settling for things and excessive unselfishness and into making what they actually want out of the lives they still have ahead. Davy is mortified by James's observations; Bill reveals that his girlfriend is pregnant and while he knows that they are not right for each other, he can't and won't leave her; Miles counters James's attacks with equally brutal honesty regarding James himself. Eventually James and Miles come to reveal the guilty secrets each has kept from the other. James found and read a novel manuscript Miles finished years ago without ever telling anyone, and has been jealous ever since but also impressed by Miles's talent. Miles has kept away from James lately because he has been unable and unwilling to cope with his best friend's illness, but he is in love and sleeping with James's married sister, and she and her children will soon come to live with Miles – something he did not intend James ever to know.

On the night they finally arrive at Barafundle Bay, James reveals the true purpose of the trip: he plans to drown himself in the sea before pain takes his life over completely. He asks his friends to let him do so and tell his family and the police that they woke up in the morning and found his body in the water. Horrified at the thought, they refuse; however, after temporarily losing James's morphine supply and witnessing him struggle with severe pain, they change their minds.

In the morning, James swims out with his friends keeping him company, and eventually Miles helps James drown himself near the shore and brings his body back.

Cast
 Benedict Cumberbatch as James
 Tom Burke as Davy
 JJ Feild as Miles
 Adam Robertson as Bill
 Hugh Bonneville as the beachcomber
 Rupert Frazer as Mr.
 Helen Griffin as Mrs.

Reception
The Observers Philip French called the film "competent", though "rather familiar and predictable, though not dislikable". The Santa Monica Daily Presss Cynthia Citron called it "an absorbing, moving, and captivating experience". The Guardians Phelim O'Neill described it as "picaresque and directionless for quite some time, only falling into focus in the final furlong".

References

External links
 
 

2010 films
2010 drama films
British drama films
Films about cancer in the United Kingdom
Films set in Wales
Films shot in Wales
2010s English-language films
2010s British films